Facundo David Cabrera Premutico (born 5 June 1991) is a Uruguayan footballer who plays as a midfielder for Central Español in the Uruguayan Segunda División.

Career
In March 2021, Cabrera joined Uruguayan Segunda División club Albion. Cabrera served as a key part of the team as they won promotion from the Segunda División, making 14 league appearances. However, Cabrera would leave the club prior to the 2022 season.

References

External links

1991 births
Living people
Atenas de San Carlos players
Plaza Colonia players
Uruguayan Primera División players
Uruguayan Segunda División players
Uruguayan footballers
Association football midfielders
C.A. Rentistas players
Albion F.C. players
Central Español players